U.S. Route 30 (US 30) runs northwest–southeast across the southern half of lower Idaho for . US 30 enters the state from Oregon across the Snake River in Fruitland  and exits into Wyoming east of Dingle. US 26 runs through the large population centers of Boise, Twin Falls, and Pocatello, as well as a plethora of smaller communities from Fruitland to Montpelier. The Thousand Springs Scenic Byway is a picturesque section of US 30 in southern Idaho between the towns of Bliss and Buhl, dipping down into the Hagerman Valley and a canyon of the Snake River.

The highway has four extensive concurrencies with Interstate Highways: Interstate 84 (I-84) twice, I-86, and I-15. Outside of its Interstate concurrencies, the route is largely two-lane and rural outside of portions through major towns and cities.

Route description

Oregon state line to Boise
After crossing the Snake River, US 30 enters Fruitland as NW 16th Street before intersecting US 95. The route then turns south along US 95 (Whitley Drive in Fruitland). Just north of the I-84 interchange, US 30 turns east toward New Plymouth. In New Plymouth, US 30 bends south, then southeast, and then south again. Just northeast of the Langley Gulch Power Plant, US 30 begins to travel southeast at a diamond interchange, running concurrently with I-84. Along the way, they serve Sand Hollow with one diamond interchange. Just north of Caldwell, US 20 and US 26 enter the freeway southeastward, joining with the concurrency. Entering Caldwell, they then serve I-84 BL/SH-19 and 10th Avenue before both US 20 and US 26 left the freeway together on Franklin Road. In Nampa, I-84 and US 30 then serve SH-55, which then travels eastward concurrently with the two routes. The three routes then serve Northside Boulevard, Franklin Boulevard, and Garrity Boulevard (I-84 BL). In Meridian, the freeway concurrency serves SH-69. On the next exit, SH-55 left the concurrency. Then, in Boise, the freeway comes across I-184 which serves Boise City Center. Between exits 52 and 54, the freeway is situated north adjacent to Boise Airport, with exit 53 serving the main terminal. Also, on exit 54, US 20 and US 26 rejoins the freeway.

Boise to Downtown Pocatello
After leaving Boise, the freeway then serves multiple roads (including SH-21) before reaching Mountain Home. In Mountain Home, the freeway serves I-84 BL. At the next exit, US 20 leaves the freeway alone. The three remaining routes went on to serve several more roads (such as I-84 BL and SH-78). Then, in Bliss, US 30 leaves the freeway and enters the Thousand Springs Scenic Byway. As US 30 approaches I-84, the route turns south and east, serving Hagerman, Buhl, Filer, and Twin Falls. North of Kimberly, the route then leaves the byway. In Burley, the route then intersects SH-27 and SH-81. In Heyburn, the route rejoins I-84 while also intersecting SH-24. They then serve SH-25/SH-77 at the exact interchange. Then, US 30 transitions from I-84 to I-86 on a modified interchange. Both I-86 and US 30 serve more roads and places (including Register Rock, I-86 BL, SH-39, and Pocatello Regional Airport). At exit 58, US 30 leaves the freeway as it approaches Pocatello. At this point, US 30 travels along a road parallel to the railroad. Along the way near downtown, it then begins to run concurrently with I-15 BL and US 91. Shortly after that, the concurrently splits into a one-way pair.

Thousand Springs Scenic Byway
The Thousand Springs Scenic Byway is a picturesque section of US 30 in southern Idaho between the towns of Bliss and Buhl, dipping down into the Hagerman Valley and a canyon of the Snake River. The byway takes its name from the numerous streams and rivulets springing forth out of the east wall of that canyon, many of them plainly visible from the road, with the panoramic river in the foreground. These springs are outlets from the Snake River Aquifer, which flows through thousands of square miles of porous volcanic rock and is one of the largest groundwater systems in the world.

Downtown Pocatello to Wyoming state line
The concurrency returns to a two-way street. It then comes across I-15 at a diamond interchange. At this point, both U.S. routes continue southeast along I-15 while I-15 BL ends there. The three routes (I-15, US 30, and US 91) then serve even more places such as another I-15 BL in Inkom. At exit 47, US 30 leaves the freeway to serve McCammon. At this point, US 30 begins to meander across several mountains. Between Alexander and Soda Springs, SH-34 runs concurrently with US 30. US 30 then serves more towns through the rest of the state, especially Montpelier. In Montpelier, US 89 briefly runs concurrently with US 30.

History

US 30 was established in 1926 during the creation of the United States Numbered Highway System, largely along the transcontinental Lincoln Highway, an existing auto trail. The corridor was also preceded by the Old Oregon Trail Highway between Oregon and Utah. The highway crossed southern Idaho by following Route 2 between the Oregon state line and Burley, where it split into two suffixed routes: US 30N through Pocatello and to Montpelier; and US 30S towards Ogden, Utah.

Construction of Interstate 80N (now I-84), a superhighway that would parallel US 30 between Portland, Oregon, and northern Utah, began in the 1960s under the Federal-Aid Highway Act of 1956. Various sections of US 30 were relocated onto the new freeway as sections opened over the following two decades. The two suffixed routes were eliminated in 1972 in favor of US 30 remaining on the northern route while generally following I-80N and I-15W (now I-86). A section through Meridian and Downtown Boise was removed in 1980, replaced by a longer overlap with I-84. Five years later, the section from Caldwell to Nampa was replaced with Interstate 84 Business.

Major intersections

References

 Idaho
Transportation in Payette County, Idaho
Transportation in Canyon County, Idaho
Transportation in Ada County, Idaho
Transportation in Elmore County, Idaho
Transportation in Gooding County, Idaho
Transportation in Twin Falls County, Idaho
Transportation in Cassia County, Idaho
Transportation in Minidoka County, Idaho
Transportation in Power County, Idaho
Transportation in Bannock County, Idaho
Transportation in Caribou County, Idaho
Transportation in Bear Lake County, Idaho
30